Stephen Semel (sometimes credited as Steve Semel or Steven Semel) is an American film and television editor, film producer, production manager, and actor. He has worked as an editor for mainstream movies, such as Airheads, The Count of Monte Cristo, Fandango, Kuffs, License to Drive, Miracle Mile, My Giant, One Eight Seven, Only the Strong, Three to Tango, The Truth About Cats & Dogs, The Way of the Gun, and You So Crazy. Semel has also edited episodes of several television series, including episodes of Century City, Dragnet, Kyle XY, House, Melrose Place, and Tales from the Crypt.

Semel has edited forty-one episodes of Lost, appearing as Adam, one of "The Others", in the season 3 premiere, "A Tale of Two Cities". From 2006 to 2010, Semel was nominated for the Primetime Emmy Award for Outstanding Single-Camera Picture Editing for a Drama Series for his work on the series, for the episodes "Live Together, Die Alone" (2006), "Through the Looking Glass" (2007), "There's No Place Like Home" (2008), "The Incident" (2009), and "The End" (2010), winning in 2010 (shared with Mark Goldman, Christopher Nelson, and Henk Van Eeghan). In addition, Semel directed two episodes, "Ji Yeon" and "The Last Recruit", in 2008 and 2010, respectively.

As well as editing eight episodes, Semel was an associate producer for Tales from the Crypt, for eighteen episodes, and was an associate producer for Steven Spielberg's Amazing Stories. He was a producer for the VHS releases – Books 1–5, along with being post-production supervisor (credited as Steven Semel) for two episodes of the series.

Semel was also an assistant film editor for Apocalypse Now (credited as Steve Semel) and an associate film editor for Galaxina. He was also an assistant editor for Back to the Future and an additional film editor for I'm Gonna Git You Sucka.

External links
 

American Cinema Editors
American production designers
American television producers
Emmy Award winners
Living people
Place of birth missing (living people)
Year of birth missing (living people)
American film editors